The Otto A.G.O. 80/100 hp aircraft engine from 1911 was a four-cylinder, water cooled inline engine built by the German Gustav Otto Flugmaschinenwerke.

Design and development

The Otto A.G.O. (Aeromotor Gustav Otto) 80/100 hp engine was designed by Hans Geisenhof in 1911 at the Gustav Otto Flugmaschinenwerke.

As with the smaller Otto A.G.O. 50 hp engine, the cylinders were cast separately from iron and then machined. They were grouped together to a single block, joined at their cooling jackets by means of flanges and bolts.
The conjoined cylinder block incorporated a single intake duct running through the water jackets, fed by a single carburettor which was installed at the control end.
There were two overhead valves per cylinder, which were operated via pushrods and rocker arms from the camshaft on the left side of the engine, with the camshaft being driven from the crankshaft by spur gears at the control end.
The magneto also was located at the control end of the engine to the right, driven from the crankshaft via an intermediate spur gear.

The crankshaft was supported by three intermediate and two outer plain bearings, with two additional thrust ball bearings at the propeller end.
Lubrication was pressure fed, with an oil pump feeding oil to the crankshaft bearings.

Variants

Otto A.G.O. 80/100 hp four-cylinder
(1911),  bore and stroke
Otto A.G.O. 100/130 hp six-cylinder
(1912),  bore and stroke

Specifications (Otto A.G.O. 80/100 hp)

See also

References

Bibliography 

1910s aircraft piston engines
Otto aircraft engines